DAV Public School, Koyla Nagar, Dhanbad came into existence when the school run by Kendriya Vidyalaya Sansthan was handed over to D.A.V. organization on 12 April 2000. It is a project school sponsored by Bharat Cooking Coal Ltd., a subsidiary of Coal India Ltd, and the entire infrastructure has been provided by BCCL. It is an English medium Co-educational school affiliated to the Central Board of Secondary Education, New Delhi, India. It is run by the D.A.V. College Managing Committee, New Delhi. Dr. K.C.Srivastava was the first principal of the school and NN Srivastava heads the school as of now.

Location
DAV Public School is located at Koyla Nagar just behind the Koyla Bhawan, BCCL Headquarters. Visitors can reach the school from the railway station or bus stand by auto rickshaw or by hiring a taxi/auto.

Overview

School is  affiliated to CBSE up to Senior  Secondary Level [10+2] from 2003. Classes are from Nursery to XII with a student strength of 5126. It owns 15 buses to carry students to school.

The curriculum is based on CBSE directives, with the guidance of the DAV College Managing Committee. The school has laboratories for physics, chemistry, biology and computers and ATL lab.

Campus
School is spread over 11.6 acres in BCCL Township in front of Koyla Bhawan, the headquarters of BCCL. The school consists of separate wings for nursery, Primary and secondary with higher secondary levels. The school is increasing the size of building within the campus by the fund aided by BCCL as the number of students are increasing. A play ground is within the school campus. In 2013 it became the center of Dhanbad& Bengal Zone of DAV 
institution.

See also
Delhi Public School, Bokaro
Education in India
CBSE

References

External links 
 DAV College Managing Committee

Schools affiliated with the Arya Samaj
Primary schools in India
High schools and secondary schools in Jharkhand
Private schools in Jharkhand
Education in Dhanbad district
Educational institutions established in 2000
2000 establishments in Bihar